Kunwara Jeeja is an Indian Punjabi movie released in 1985.

Cast
Satish Kaul
Raza Murad
Mehar Mittal
Aruna Irani
Bhavana Bhatt
Kanchan Mattu

Crew
Music Director: Kamalkant
Lyrics: Varma Malik
Playback: Dilraj Kaur, Rajan Angrish, Chandrani Mukherji and Anuradha
Producer: Rajiv Angrish
Director: Subhash Bhakri

References 

Punjabi-language Indian films
1980s Punjabi-language films
1985 films